Václav Čížek (born July 30, 1989) is a Czech professional ice hockey defenceman currently playing for HC Košice of the Tipsport Liga.

Čižek played with BK Mladá Boleslav in the Czech Extraliga between 2008 and 2012. He joined HC '05 Banská Bystrica of the Tipsport Liga on October 31, 2014.

References

External links

1989 births
Living people
HC '05 Banská Bystrica players
Czech ice hockey defencemen
HC Košice players
BK Mladá Boleslav players
HC Most players
HC Nové Zámky players
Stadion Hradec Králové players
MsHK Žilina players
People from Prague-East District
Sportspeople from the Central Bohemian Region
Czech expatriate ice hockey players in Slovakia